Laura Lee Hope is a pseudonym used by the Stratemeyer Syndicate for the Bobbsey Twins and several other series of children's novels. Actual writers taking up the pen of Laura Lee Hope include Edward Stratemeyer, Howard and Lilian Garis, Elizabeth Ward, Harriet (Stratemeyer) Adams, Andrew E. Svenson, June M. Dunn, Grace Grote and Nancy Axelrad.

Laura Lee Hope was first used as a pseudonym in 1904 for the debut of the Bobbsey Twins.

Series
The Bobbsey Twins (1904–1979)
The Outdoor Girls (23 vols. 1913–1933)
The Moving Picture Girls (7 vols. 1914–1916)
Bunny Brown (20 vols. 1916–1931)
Six Little Bunkers (14 vols. 1918–1930)
Make Believe Stories (12 vols. c. 1920–1923)
Blythe Girls (12 vols. 1925–1932)

References

External links

 
 
 
 
 

Stratemeyer Syndicate pseudonyms